The 26th Senate District of Wisconsin is one of 33 districts in the Wisconsin State Senate.  Located in south-central Wisconsin, the district comprises nearly all of the city of Madison, Wisconsin, in central Dane County.  The district contains landmarks such as the Wisconsin State Capitol, the University of Wisconsin–Madison campus, the University of Wisconsin Arboretum, historic Forest Hill Cemetery, Edgewood College, Monona Terrace, and the Kohl Center.

Current elected officials
Kelda Roys is the senator representing the 26th district. She was first elected in the 2020 general election.  Before serving as a senator, she was a member of the Wisconsin State Assembly from 2009 to 2013.

Each Wisconsin State Senate district is composed of three Wisconsin State Assembly districts.  The 26th Senate district comprises the 76th, 77th, and 78th Assembly districts.  The current representatives of those districts are:
 Assembly District 76: Francesca Hong (D–Madison)
 Assembly District 77: Shelia bs (D–Madison)
 Assembly District 78: Lisa Subeck (D–Madison)

The district is located entirely within Wisconsin's 2nd congressional district, which is represented by U.S. Representative Mark Pocan.

Past senators
Previous senators include:

Note: the boundaries of districts have changed repeatedly over history. Previous politicians of a specific numbered district have represented a completely different geographic area, due to redistricting.

References

External links
District Website
Senator Risser's Website

Wisconsin State Senate districts
Dane County, Wisconsin
Madison, Wisconsin
1856 establishments in Wisconsin